Aporhina bispinosa is a species of Brentidae family, Eurhynchinae subfamily.

Description 
This beetle has a dark green or blackish coloration and two long thorns in the middle of elytra (hence the Latin name "bispinosa).

Distribution 
This species occurs in Papua New Guinea.

References 

 Catalogue of Life
 Wtaxa
 Biolib
 Bishop Museum

External links 
 Anic.ento

Brentidae
Beetles described in 1835
Insects of Papua New Guinea